The Blood of Fu Manchu, also known as Kiss of Death, Kiss and Kill (U.S. title) and Against All Odds (original U.S. video title),  is a 1968 British adventure crime film directed by Jesús Franco, based on the fictional Asian villain Dr. Fu Manchu created by Sax Rohmer. It was the fourth film in a series, and was preceded by The Vengeance of Fu Manchu. The Castle of Fu Manchu followed in 1969.

It was produced by Harry Alan Towers for Udastex Films. It starred Christopher Lee as Dr. Fu Manchu, Richard Greene as Scotland Yard detective Nayland Smith, and Howard Marion-Crawford as Dr. Petrie. The film was filmed in Spain and Brazil. Shirley Eaton appears in a scene that she claimed she was never paid for; apparently, the director Jesús Franco had inserted some stock footage of her from one of her films (The Girl from Rio (1968)) into the film without telling her. She only found out years later that she had been in a Fu Manchu film.

Plot
In his remote jungle hideout, the evil Dr. Fu Manchu, with his sadistic daughter Lin Tang, has discovered a deadly venom in a "lost city" in the Amazonian jungle that affects only men. Women can become carriers of the "kiss of death" by being bitten by venomous snakes. The venom causes blindness and is ultimately followed six weeks later by death. Using mind control, he aims six women at Nayland Smith and other key people with political influence. This prevents them from interfering with his own ambitions: to prepare millions of "doses" and spread them around the world's major cities and capitals in a plan to gain world domination.

Cast
Credits adapted from the booklet of the Powerhouse Films Blu-ray boxset The Fu Manchu Cycle: 1965-1969.

Christopher Lee as Fu Manchu
Tsai Chin as Lin Tang
Maria Rohm as Ursula Wagner
Richard Greene as Nayland Smith
Howard Marion-Crawford as Dr. Petrie
Frances Khan as Carmen
Isaura de Oliveira as Yuma
Shirley Eaton as Black Widow
Götz George as Carl Jansen
Ricardo Palacios as Sancho Lopez
Loni von Friedl as Celeste
Uncredited:
Marcelo Arroita-Jáuregui as The Governor
Olívia Pineschi as Fu's Girl
Vicente Roca as Governor's Secretary
Francesca Tu as Lotus

References

External links

 
 

1968 films
1968 adventure films
1960s crime thriller films
British adventure films
British crime thriller films
Spanish crime thriller films
West German films
1960s English-language films
English-language German films
English-language Spanish films
Films directed by Jesús Franco
Films set in the 1920s
Films set in South America
Films shot in Madrid
Films based on British novels
Fu Manchu films
Films shot in Brazil
1960s British films